Partho Ghosh is an Indian film director and producer of Bollywood. He has also directed Bengali films. His  successful films include 100 Days with Jackie Shroff and Madhuri Dixit and Teesra Kaun with Mithun Chakraborty. But he is known for the success of Dalaal (1993) and then Agni Sakshi (1996) with Nana Patekar.

Career
Ghosh started his career in Hindi cinema as an assistance director with small films (1985). His first big directorial  film was100 Days(1991). The film was a superhit. It was a remake of Tamil Film Nooravathu Naal. His movie Dalaal(1993), was one of highest grossing Movie in 1993. , he had written and directed more than 15 movies. Another hit movie Tisra kaun(1994), this film is the remake of 1990 Malayalam film No.20 Madras Mail directed by Joshiy, starring Mohanlal in lead role.

In 2010, Ghosh directed Ek Second... Jo Zindagi Badal De? and Rehmat Ali - 2010. Currently Ghosh has written Agni Shakhi(Part2) and Dalal (Part 2) these two movie may came in 2016. He has also Produced and directed several Bengali films and TV Serials.

Awards

Filmfare Awards
 1997: Nominated: Filmfare Award for Best Director: Agni Sakshi

Filmography

 100 Days (1991)
 Geet (1992)
 Dalaal (1993)
 Teesra Kaun (1994)
 Agni Sakshi (1996)
 Jeevan Yudh (1997)
 Jiban Yuddha (1997)
 Ghulam-E-Mustafa (1997)
 Kaun Sachcha Kaun Jhootha (1997)
 Yugpurush (1998)
 Khote Sikkey (1998)
 Maseeha (2002)
 Surya (2002)
 Sitam (2005)
 Rehmat Ali (2010)
 Ek Second... Jo Zindagi Badal De? (2010)
Mausam Ikrar Ke Do Pal Pyar Ke (2018)

References

External links

1955 births
Living people
Film directors from West Bengal
Hindi-language film directors
Hindi film producers
Film producers from West Bengal
20th-century Indian film directors
21st-century Indian film directors